A list of the films produced in Mexico in 1952 (see 1952 in film):

1952

See also
1952 in Mexico

References

External links

1952
Films
Lists of 1952 films by country or language